María José Marenco (born September 27, 1976) is a Salvadoran former swimmer. She represented El Salvador at the age of 15 at the 1992 Summer Olympics in Barcelona in the 200 metre freestyle, 400 metre freestyle and 800 metre freestyle competing in the heats. She also acted as the flag bearer for the El Salvador team of 4 athletes during the opening ceremony.

Marenco represented El Salvador at the Central American Games and the Central American and Caribbean Swimming Championships on a number of occasions. At the 1994 Central American Games hosted in her home country, she was considered such a good medal hope in the freestyle event the then President of El Salvador Alfredo Cristiani attended her competition.

Record at the 1992 Olympics

References

External links
 

Living people
1976 births
Salvadoran female swimmers
Swimmers at the 1992 Summer Olympics
Olympic swimmers of El Salvador
20th-century Salvadoran women